is a Japanese-only PlayStation 2 otome game (also referred to as GxB games) released on June 10, 2004.  A notable feature of the game is the integration of real J-pop songs into the gameplay, and the ability to watch and listen to the songs again once you have mastered them in-game, as well as the fact that the main character has a voice (many otome games' main characters are not voice acted). The publisher classifies it as a  game.

Gameplay
There are two main elements to the gameplay of Houkago no Love Beat. The narrative element involves the main character having conversations with other characters, making choices that affect the storyline.  The 'live part' is a minigame where the player uses the PS2 controller to affect the performance of the band during various songs.  If the player does a good job, the song is performed well, and if the player misses a lot of cues, the band performs badly.  This in turn affects how well the band is received, whether they get a contract, etc.

Plot
The main character is a high school girl trained in classical piano who has just transferred to a new high school, Aobadai Gakuen.  On her first day, she gets lost and meets 4 boys there who are secretly practising as a band.  She eventually becomes the songwriter for the band, using her classical background to create fresh melodies for the band to build on.

There's a rival band, Kamui, that also plays a couple songs during the game and provides some plot devices regarding a big band contest with a recording contract as the prize.

Characters
Main character: High school girl, her default name is Ruka Hibiki but it can be changed. Voice actor: Masano Hosono
Kaito Momose: The band's singer. Voice actor: Akira Ishida
Itsuki Tsukuwano: The band's bassist.  Voice actor: Daisuke Ono
Keisuke Hijirinaka: The band's guitarist.  Voice actor: Tomohiro Tsuboi
Kurusu Tenjou: The band's drummer.  Voice actor: Takahiro Kawanago
Kaoru Himuro: Kamui's vocalist.  Voice actor: Kenno Kase
Akira Himuro: Kamui's guitarist. Voice actor: Kazumi Tsuruda

External links
Official website 

2004 video games
D3 Publisher games
HuneX games
Japan-exclusive video games
Otome games
PlayStation 2 games
PlayStation 2-only games
Romance video games
Single-player video games
Video games developed in Japan
Visual novels